Katra Rural District is a rural district (dehestan) in Nashta District, Tonekabon County, Mazandaran Province, Iran. At the 2006 census, its population was 8,032, in 2,278 families. The rural district has 17 villages.

References 

Rural Districts of Mazandaran Province
Tonekabon County